Markit Ltd. was a British financial information and services company with over 4,000 employees, founded in 2003 as an independent source of credit derivative pricing. The company provides independent data, trade processing of derivatives, foreign exchange and loans, customised technology platforms and managed services. The company aims to enhance transparency, reduce financial risk and improve operational efficiency. Its client base includes institutional participants in the financial marketplace. On 12 July 2016, Markit and IHS Inc. merged in an all-stock merger of equals to form IHS Markit. IHS Markit later merged with S&P Global on 28 February 2022.

Background
Markit was founded in 2003 by Canadian Lance Uggla in St Albans, outside London, as Mark-it Partners to provide daily credit default swap (CDS) pricing.

Markit's credit derivative data sales rose during the subprime mortgage crisis in 2007 and later years.

In September 2009, Markit and Depository Trust & Clearing Corporation (DTCC) launched MarkitSERV, a joint venture to provide over-the-counter (OTC) derivative trade processing.

On 5 May 2014 Markit Ltd., a company registered in Bermuda, filed for an initial public offering (IPO), to be listed on the NASDAQ Global Select Market under the symbol MRKT. The stock began trading on 19 June 2014 with an initial pricing of $24 per share.

Company performance
By 2009 Markit had "1,000 institutions as clients - including investment banks, hedge funds, asset managers, central banks, regulators, rating agencies, and insurance companies."

In 2012, the company had annual revenues of US$860 million, with 3000 employees.  In 2012, Markit had a $5 billion valuation.

By 2013 Markit served 3,000 institutions across the financial markets which include investment banks, hedge funds, asset managers, central banks, regulators, auditors, fund administrators and insurance companies.

Acquisitions

Totem Valuations, a supplier of consensus valuations and month-end data, was bought by Markit in May 2004

The International Index Company (IIC) and CDS Index Company (CDSIndexCo), owners of the iTraxx and CDX credit default swap indexes, were acquired by Markit in November 2007

SwapsWire's acquisition by Markit announced In December 2007.,

The BOAT,  Markets in Financial Instruments Directive-compliant trade reporting platform acquired by Markit from a consortium of nine investment banks In January 2008. The BOAT was owned by consortium of nine investment banks —ABN Amro, Citigroup, Credit Suisse, Deutsche Bank, Goldman Sachs, HSBC, Merrill Lynch, Morgan Stanley and UBS who had launched the system in September 2006. The Boat platform was established by these nine banks "for the collection and sale of trading data following the introduction of EU's Markets in Financial Instruments Directive (MiFID) in November 2007.

JPMorgan Chase's FCS Corporation, a provider of syndicated loan market portfolio and risk management software and services, including the Wall Street Office family of products, was acquired by Markit in July 2008.

Fidelity Information Services's ClearPar, an electronic loan-trade-processing platform, was acquired by Markit in October 2009 which helped Markit to work with DTCC to improve the processing of syndicated loans.

Index products

On 17 January 2006 CDS IndexCo and Markit launched ABX.HE, a subprime mortgage backed credit derivative index, with planned to extend the index to underlying asset types other than home equity loans. 

They launched the Home Equity (ABX.HE) ABX on 19 January 2006. 

Others, such as Credit Cards (ABX.CC), Student Loans (ABX.SL) Auto Loans (ABX.AU) were to be announced in the future. 

The Loan credit default swap index (LCDX), a loan-only credit default swap index was created in 2007 by CDS Index Company (CDSIndexCo). 

Sixteen major financial institutions, JPMorgan, Goldman Sachs, Deutsche Bank, Barclays Capital, Bank of America, BNP Paribas, Citigroup, Credit Suisse, Lehman Brothers, Merrill Lynch, RBS Greenwich, UBS and Wachovia, owned the private company called the CDS Index Company (CDS IndexCo), that developed the ABX index. Markit Group Limited marketed the ABX index, and by 2007, had acquired (CDS IndexCo). The ABX index was a credit default swap of asset-backed mortgages of 30 of the most liquid mortgage-backed bonds. 

Atlanta-based IntercontinentalExchange (NYSE: ICE), a derivatives exchange and clearing house operator, announced four credit index futures contracts, based on the Markit CDX and Markit iTraxx indices—Markit CDX NA IG, Markit CDX NA HY, Markit iTraxx Europe (Main), and 
Markit iTraxx Crossover, would start in May 2013. The contracts were subject to review by the Commodity Futures Trading Commission.

Management and employees

Markit had 150 employees in 2003, and by the end of 2013 had around 3200 employees across the globe.

Management per June 2016:

Shareholders
In 2013, different banks held 51% of Markit shares. 20% of shares is held by Markit employees and executives.
As of October 2013, General Atlantic is the biggest independent shareholder with 11% of shares. General Atlantic's CEO William E. Ford serves on the board of directors.
Temasek Holdings bought 10% of shares in 2013 for $500 million, thereby valuing the company at $5 bn.

Divisions, products and services
Markit organizes itself in three divisions:

References

External links

Financial services companies of the United Kingdom
Companies based in the City and District of St Albans
Financial services companies established in 2003
Financial data vendors
2003 establishments in England
Companies formerly listed on the Nasdaq
2014 initial public offerings